Shakespeare's Kings: The Great Plays and the History of England in the Middle Ages: 1337–1485 (1999)  is a non-fiction book by John Julius Norwich. Lord Norwich was a British historian, author, and peer. The book was published by Penguin Group in Great Britain. The intent of the book was to provide historical context behind nine of Shakespeare's histories, allowing for the fact that, as an artist, Shakespeare's purpose was dramatic impact more than absolute historical accuracy. The nine plays span a period of approximately 150 years of British history. Norwich seeks to address the real people and real events behind the histories and identify, as much as possible, where the plays and the facts coincide and where they may differ. He addresses the plays in chronological order, while Shakespeare composed them in a much more random sequence. Norwich's book covers the history relating to the following plays:

 Edward III
 Richard II
 Henry IV, Part 1
 Henry IV, Part 2
 Henry V
 Henry VI, Part 1
 Henry VI, Part 2
 Henry VI, Part 3
 Richard III

The play concerning Edward III is believed by some scholars to be authored by Shakespeare, but it has not historically been included in the Shakespeare canon.

See also
 Asimov's Guide to Shakespeare

Kings, Shakespeare's
1999 non-fiction books
20th-century history books
Works about William Shakespeare
Books by John Julius Norwich
History books about England
History books about the Middle Ages
Penguin Books books